Pseudatteria heliocausta is a species of moth of the family Tortricidae. It is found in Colombia. The form baccheutis is found in Costa Rica.

References

Moths described in 1912
Pseudatteria